The 2022–23 I liga (also known as Fortuna I liga due to sponsorship reasons) is the 75th season of the second tier domestic division in the Polish football league system since its establishment in 1949 and the 15th season of the Polish I liga under its current title. The league is operated by the PZPN.

The regular season is being played as a round-robin tournament. A total of 18 teams participate, 12 of which competed in the league campaign during the previous season, while three to be relegated from the 2021–22 Ekstraklasa and the remaining three to be promoted from the 2021–22 II liga. The season started on 15 July 2022 and will conclude on 11 June 2023. Each team will play a total of 34 matches, half at home and half away.

Teams
A total of 18 teams participate in the 2022–23 I liga season.

Changes from last season
The following teams have changed division since the 2021–22 season.

To I liga

From I liga

Stadiums and locations

''Note: Table lists in alphabetical order.

 Due to the renovation of the Resovia Stadium in Rzeszów, Resovia will play their home games at Stadion Stal in Rzeszów.
 In the first half of the 2022/2023 season Skra played every home match on the opponent's stadium, as the home team, because Municipal Football Stadium Loretańska in Częstochowa didn't meet the license requirements of the I liga. From April 16, 2022, they play their home games at a substitute stadium GIEKSA Arena. Originally they declared to play home matches at the Stadion Ludowy in Sosnowiec.
 Zagłębie Sosnowiec played their games on Stadion Ludowy until 18 February 2023. Since 25 February they moved to ArcelorMittal Park where Zagłębie played the rest of the season on.

League table

Positions by round

Results

Results by round

Promotion play-offs
I liga play-offs final for the 2022–23 season will be played on 11 June 2023. The teams who finished in 3rd, 4th, 5th and 6th place are set to compete. The fixtures are determined by final league position – 3rd team of regular season vs 6th team of regular season and 4th team of regular season vs 5th team of regular season. The winner of final match will be promoted to the Ekstraklasa for next season. All matches will be played in a stadiums of team which occupied higher position in regular season.

Matches

Semi-finals

Final

Season statistics

Top goalscorers

Top assists

Number of teams by region

See also
2022–23 Ekstraklasa
2022–23 II liga
2022–23 III liga
2022–23 Polish Cup
2022 Polish Super Cup

Notes

References

External link
 

I liga seasons
2022–23 in Polish football
Poland